Jujubinus tumidulus is a species of sea snail, a marine gastropod mollusk in the family Trochidae, the top snails.

Description
The size of the shell varies between 2 mm and 6 mm.

Distribution
This species occurs in the Mediterranean Sea.

References

 Aradas A., 1846: Memoria I. Descrizione di varie specie nuove di conchiglie viventi e fossili della Sicilia; Atti dell'Accademia Gioenia di Scienze Naturali (2) 3: 157–184 
 Gofas, S.; Le Renard, J.; Bouchet, P. (2001). Mollusca, in: Costello, M.J. et al. (Ed.) (2001). European register of marine species: a check-list of the marine species in Europe and a bibliography of guides to their identification. Collection Patrimoines Naturels, 50: pp. 180–213

External links
 

tumidulus
Gastropods described in 1846